"Touch" is a song by Canadian rock band The Tea Party. It was released as a promotional single in Australia and Canada and a single in Germany then withdrawn, prior to the release of the European Triptych Tour Edition 2000 album. The German single features a remix of "Temptation" by Rhys Fulber and, "Turn The Lamp Down Low (blues version)" recorded during The Edges of Twilight sessions.

"Touch" is the opening song on Triptych, a rock composition of heavy drums, distorted guitar and bass with a keyboard accompaniment.

Track listing 
"Touch"
"Temptation (remix)"
"Turn the Lamp down Low (blues version)"

References 

2000 singles
The Tea Party songs
2000 songs
EMI Records singles